Theodorus Maurita Frenkel (14 July 1871 – 20 September 1956) was a Dutch film director, actor and screenwriter of the silent era. He worked in Britain under the name Theo Bouwmeester, using the surname of his renowned mother and uncle (both accomplished actors), before working in Germany in 1913 and 1914 and then returning to the Netherlands, a neutral country, before World War I. He directed more than 200 films between 1908 and 1928. He also appeared in 21 films between 1911 and 1948. His nephew Theo Frenkel Jr. (1893–1955) was a film actor.

Selected filmography

 By Order of Napoleon (1910 - director, early feature in Kinemacolor)
 Luchtkastelen (1914 - actor)
 Zijn viool (1914 - actor)
 Fatum (1915)
 Het Wrak in de Noordzee (1915)
 Genie tegen geweld (1916)
 Life's Shadows (1916)
 Pro domo (1918)
 Het proces Begeer (1918)
 De duivel (1918)
 Ray of Sunshine (1919)
 The Devil in Amsterdam (1919)
 Op stap door Amsterdam (1919)
 Helleveeg (1920)
 Aan boord van de 'Sabina' (1920)
 Geeft ons kracht (1920)
 Menschenwee (1921)
 De bruut (1922)
 Judith (1923)
 Frauenmoral (1923)
 Cirque hollandais (1924)
 De cabaret-prinses (1925)
 Bet naar de Olympiade (1928)

References

External links

1871 births
1956 deaths
Dutch film directors
Dutch male film actors
Dutch male silent film actors
Dutch screenwriters
Dutch male screenwriters
Mass media people from Rotterdam
20th-century screenwriters